This is a comprehensive list of all universities in Australia by total university enrolment. The data is gathered from the Department of Education and Training Higher Education statistics from 2016. For accuracy of comparison, all data is measured in Equivalent Full-Time Student Load (EFTSL) except for "Total Students".

National universities

Australian Capital Territory

New South Wales

Northern Territory

Queensland

South Australia

Tasmania

Victoria

Western Australia

Largest universities

By all students

By EFTSL

By enrolments

By undergraduate students

By postgraduate students

References

External links
 Australian University Rankings

 
Australia education-related lists
Australia